This is a list of European (as well as Australian and Japanese) colonial administrators responsible for the territory of Portuguese Timor, an area equivalent to modern-day East Timor.

List

(Dates in italics indicate de facto continuation of office)

For continuation after independence, see: President of East Timor

See also
 East Timor
 Politics of East Timor
 President of East Timor
 Prime Minister of East Timor
 East Timor (Indonesian province)#Governors
 List of colonial Residents of Dutch Timor
 List of rulers of Timor
 Lists of office-holders

External links
 World Statesmen – Timor-Leste (East Timor)

Political history of Portugal
History of East Timor
List
Timor